A list of films produced in Italy in 1953 (see 1953 in film):

A-C

D-G

H-N

P-Z

Documentaries

References

External links
Italian films of 1953 on IMDb

Italian
1953
Films